IF Heimer was a Swedish football club located in Lidköping in Lidköping Municipality, Västra Götaland County.

Background
IF Heimer was a sports club from Lidköping that was founded by several young men in the town on 18 March 1906.

Since their foundation IF Heimer has participated mainly in the middle divisions of the Swedish football league system.  Their best period was in the 1920s including the years 1925 to 1928 when they played in Division 2 Västsvenska which was then the second tier of Swedish football. In 1941 they played a Division 2 promotion qualification match with Skogen before 4,027 spectators but their all time attendance record was the 4,178 people who attended a friendly match against IFK Norrkoping in 1948.

The lowest point for the club was in 1952 when they finished bottom of Division 5 but they subsequently played many years in Division 3 followed by spells in Division 2 over the last two decades. The club currently plays in Division 3 Mellersta Götaland which is the fifth tier of Swedish football. They have played their home matches at the Framnäs IP in Lidköping since 1915. In 2012 Heimer merged with Lidköpings IF to form Lidköpings FK.

IF Heimer was affiliated to the Västergötlands Fotbollförbund.

Season to season

Attendances

In recent seasons IF Heimer have had the following average attendances:

Footnotes

External links
 IF Heimer – Official website
  IF Heimer Facebook

Football clubs in Västra Götaland County
Association football clubs established in 1906
1906 establishments in Sweden